David Young (born 12 November 1945) is an English footballer who made 209 appearances in the Football League. A central defender, he won the FA Cup in 1973 as Sunderland's unused substitute in their victory over Leeds United. In Canada, he played on loan with Vancouver Spartans in 1972.

References

1945 births
Living people
English footballers
Footballers from Newcastle upon Tyne
Association football defenders
Charlton Athletic F.C. players
Newcastle United F.C. players
Southend United F.C. players
Sunderland A.F.C. players
English Football League players